Rheoheros is a genus of cichlids. These freshwater fish are found in the Atlantic slope of Mexico and Guatemala in moderately to fast-flowing waters of the Grijalva-Usumacinta River system.

Species
There are currently 2 recognized species in this genus:
 Rheoheros coeruleus (Stawikowski & U. Werner, 1987)
 Rheoheros lentiginosus (Steindachner, 1864) (Freckled cichlid)

References

Heroini
Cichlid genera